Narangi railway station is a small railway station in Guwahati, Assam. Its code is NNGE. It serves the Narengi area of Guwahati City. The station consists of 2 platforms. A small local vegetable market called Kolong Par Bazaar lies just beside the exit from the station.

References

External links

Railway stations in Guwahati
Lumding railway division